Paul Basil O'Halloran (born 17 April 1950) is a former Australian politician.

Early life
O'Halloran grew up on a dairy farm at Preolenna on the north west coast of Tasmania and later moved to North Motton. Early in life he was a Labor supporter, but his activism in the Franklin Dam dispute lead him to the Greens. Prior to politics, he was a schoolteacher and administrator and later a scientist at the University of Tasmania, where he managed a university agricultural industry project aimed at linking educator providers with industry.

Political career
O'Halloran was a Greens candidate for several state elections before being elected to the Division of Braddon in the Tasmanian House of Assembly in 2010, receiving 7.9% of first preference votes. O'Halloran is the first Greens member for Braddon since Di Hollister lost her seat in 1998.

He was not re-elected at the 2014 House of Assembly elections.

References

1950 births
Living people
Australian Greens members of the Parliament of Tasmania
Members of the Tasmanian House of Assembly
Australian schoolteachers
21st-century Australian politicians